Corallistidae is a family of sea sponges.

Genera 
Awhiowhio Kelly, 2007
Corallistes Schmidt, 1870
Herengeria Lévi & Lévi, 1988
Isabella Schlacher-Hoenlinger, Pisera & Hooper, 2005
Neophrissospongia Pisera & Lévi, 2002
Neoschrammeniella Pisera & Lévi, 2002

References

 

Tetractinellida
Taxa named by William Johnson Sollas